Wigtownshire, was a Scottish constituency of the House of Commons of the Parliament of Great Britain from 1708 to 1801 and of the Parliament of the United Kingdom from 1801 to 1918. It was represented by one Member of Parliament.

Creation
The British parliamentary constituency was created in 1708 following the Acts of Union, 1707 and replaced the former Parliament of Scotland shire constituency of Wigtownshire which had previously been represented by two Shire Commissioners. The first British general election in Wigtownshire was in 1708. In 1707–08, members of the 1702–1707 Parliament of Scotland were co-opted to serve in the 1st Parliament of Great Britain. See Scottish representatives to the 1st Parliament of Great Britain, for further details.

Boundaries 
Wigtownshire was a Scottish shire (later known as a county). The constituency included the whole shire, except that between 1708 and 1885 the burghs of Stranraer, New Galloway, Whithorn and Wigtown, formed part of the Wigtown Burghs constituency.

History
The constituency elected one Member of Parliament (MP) by the first past the post system until the seat was abolished in 1918.

 In 1918 the Wigtownshire area was combined with Kirkcudbrightshire to form the Galloway constituency.

Members of Parliament

Pre-1832 election results

Elections in the 1830s

Election results 1832-1868

Elections in the 1830s

Elections in the 1840s

Elections in the 1850s

Dalrymple resigned by accepting the office of Steward of the Manor of Northstead, causing a by-election.

Elections in the 1860s

Election results 1868-1880

Elections in the 1860s

Elections in the 1870s
Stewart succeeded to the peerage, becoming Earl of Galloway.

Elections in the 1880s

Election results 1885-1918

Elections in the 1880s

In July 1886, Sir Herbert Maxwell accepted office as a Junior Lord of the Treasury, causing a by-election.

Elections in the 1890s

Elections in the 1900s

Elections in the 1910s

General Election 1914–15:

Another General Election was required to take place before the end of 1915. The political parties had been making preparations for an election to take place and by the July 1914, the following candidates had been selected; 
Unionist: 
Liberal:

At the 1915 Wigtownshire by-election, Hew Hamilton Dalrymple (Conservative) was returned unopposed on 12 February 1915.

References

Sources 
 British Parliamentary Election Results 1832-1885, compiled and edited by F.W.S. Craig (Macmillan Press 1977)
 British Parliamentary Election Results 1885-1918, compiled and edited by F.W.S. Craig (Macmillan Press 1974)
 The Parliaments of England by Henry Stooks Smith (1st edition published in three volumes 1844–50), second edition edited (in one volume) by F.W.S. Craig (Political Reference Publications 1973))

Politics of Dumfries and Galloway
Historic parliamentary constituencies in Scotland (Westminster)
Constituencies of the Parliament of the United Kingdom disestablished in 1918
Constituencies of the Parliament of the United Kingdom established in 1708
Wigtownshire